Kohnab-e Bala (also Romanized as Kohnāb-e Bālā; also known as Kohnāb-e Sar) is a village in Gowharan Rural District, Gowharan District, Bashagard County, Hormozgan Province, Iran. At the 2006 census, its population was 139, in 28 families.

References 

Populated places in Bashagard County